Alrik Sandberg (3 April 1885 – 26 February 1975) was a Swedish wrestler. He competed in the heavyweight event at the 1912 Summer Olympics.

References

External links
 

1885 births
1975 deaths
Olympic wrestlers of Sweden
Wrestlers at the 1912 Summer Olympics
Swedish male sport wrestlers
People from Eskilstuna
Sportspeople from Södermanland County